Darren William Rumble (born January 23, 1969) is a Canadian professional ice hockey coach and former professional ice hockey player. Rumble played for the Philadelphia Flyers, Ottawa Senators, St. Louis Blues and Tampa Bay Lightning of the National Hockey League, but played most of his career with various minor league teams. In 2003–04  season Rumble spent majority of the season in the NHL, played only 5 games for Tampa Bay. Rumble spent most of the season as a healthy reserve. Tampa Bay Lightning still had his name inscribed on the Stanley Cup even though he did not officially qualify. The following year he played a handful of games for the Lightnings' AHL Affiliate Springfield Falcons before retiring and becoming assistant coach of the team. Rumble later became head coach of the Norfolk Admirals of the American Hockey League (AHL), holding the position until January 2010.
In 2013, he was assistant coach for the Icelandic National hockey team in the IIHF Hockey World Championship Div.II in Croatia.

Playing career
As a youth, Rumble played in the 1982 Quebec International Pee-Wee Hockey Tournament with a minor ice hockey team from Barrie.

Rumble was selected 20th overall by the Philadelphia Flyers in the 1987 NHL Entry Draft. Rumble turned professional with the Hershey Bears in 1989–90. He played three seasons with the Bears, managing three games with the Flyers. He was selected in the 1992 NHL Expansion Draft by the Ottawa Senators. He played two seasons with Ottawa, before returning to the AHL with the Prince Edward Island Senators. In 1995, he became the property of the Flyers for the second time, and mostly played for their affiliates the Hershey Bears and the Philadelphia Phantoms. He did manage 15 games in the NHL.

In 1997, he left North America to play one season for the Adler Mannheim in the Deutsche Eishockey Liga. After that season, Rumble would spend the following seven seasons with various AHL and IHL teams, with occasional callups to NHL clubs St. Louis Blues and Tampa Bay Lightning, including five games with the Lightning in the 2003–04 season for which the club won the Stanley Cup. His final playing season was with Springfield in 2004–05, becoming their assistant coach as a mid-season replacement. Over his career, Rumble played 193 career NHL games, scoring 10 goals and 26 assists for 36 points.

Coaching career

In 2007, he joined the Norfolk Admirals of the AHL as an assistant coach. In July 2008, the Tampa Bay Lightning named Rumble Head Coach of their AHL affiliate the Norfolk Admirals replacing Steve Stirling. On January 12, 2010, he was fired by the Lightning. He subsequently became an assistant coach for the Seattle Thunderbirds. In July 2013, he was named head coach of the Moncton Wildcats (QMJHL).

Career statistics

Awards
 1997 - Eddie Shore Award - AHL top defenceman

References

External links
 

1969 births
Living people
Adler Mannheim players
Barrie Colts players
Canadian ice hockey defencemen
Grand Rapids Griffins (IHL) players
Hershey Bears players
Ice hockey people from Ontario
Kitchener Rangers players
Moncton Wildcats coaches
National Hockey League first-round draft picks
New Haven Senators players
Ottawa Senators players
Philadelphia Flyers draft picks
Philadelphia Flyers players
Philadelphia Phantoms players
Prince Edward Island Senators players
St. Louis Blues players
San Antonio Dragons players
Sportspeople from Barrie
Springfield Falcons players
Stanley Cup champions
Tampa Bay Lightning players
Utah Grizzlies (IHL) players
Worcester IceCats players
Canadian expatriate ice hockey players in Germany
Canadian ice hockey coaches